Kaihui is a town in Changsha County, Hunan Province, China. It administers six villages and one community. Baisha town merged to Kaihui on November 19, 2015.

References

Divisions of Changsha County
Changsha County